Bangladesh Students' Union (BSU) is a leading student organization in Bangladesh, instituted in 1952. The organization's mission is to work for students and youth rights as a secular and progressive students' organization in Bangladesh as well as all over the world as the member of several international students' and youth organizations. BSU works as a conscious, advanced and struggling progressive representative of the students of Bangladesh as an independent, unique, democratic, pluralistic, non-profit, non-governmental, non-partisan student organization which embraces, represents and defends the interests of students and their rights. Unlike most student organizations in Bangladesh, BSU is not directly involved with any political party.

See also
 List of student organizations in Bangladesh

References

External links 
 

Student organisations in Bangladesh
Bangladeshi student movements
Student wings of political parties in Bangladesh
Student organizations established in 1952